CJTB-FM is a French language community radio station that operates at 93.1 MHz (FM) in Tête-à-la-Baleine, Quebec, Canada.

Owned by Radio communautaire Tête-à-la-Baleine, the station received CRTC approval in 2003.

The station is a member of the Association des radiodiffuseurs communautaires du Québec.

References

External links
arcq.qc.ca/portfolio/cjtb
 

Jtb
Jtb
Jtb
Radio stations established in 2003
2003 establishments in Quebec